This is a list of exhibitions by Independent Curators International since 1975.



List

External links 
 Past exhibitions, Independent Curators International

American contemporary art
Arts-related lists